BankservAfrica is an automated clearing house located in Johannesburg, South Africa and operates both nationally and within Africa.

Annually processing billions of transactions valued at trillions of South African rand; BankservAfrica's clients include banks, corporates, government and the retail sector. By volume of transactions alone, it is rated as Africaʼs largest automated payments clearing house.

History 
Prior to the establishment of BankservAfrica, the South African banking industry owned several companies that provided shared services to the industry in a number of different payment channels. As these companies operated in silos, a need was identified for a single structure and an interbank task group was appointed to investigate the feasibility.  BankservAfrica was founded in 1972 as the Automated Clearing Bureau (Pty) Limited to service the banking industry by providing interoperability between the banks. In December 1993 the name changed to Bankserv and in 2010 the group rebranded as BankservAfrica.

Shareholders 
Wholly owned by South Africa's commercial banks, shareholders include:
 Absa Bank Limited (23.125%)
 FirstRand Limited (23.125%)
 Nedbank Limited (23.125%)
 Standard Bank of South Africa Limited (23.125%)
 Dandyshelf Group (7.5%), consisting of:
Grobank
Bidvest Bank
Capitec Bank
CitiBank
Investec Bank
Mercantile Bank
Teba Bank Limited

Activities 
The company ensures that interbank transactions occur in a properly regulated system, compliant with international banking best practice and standards, while reducing risk and complexity in the industry.   This has led to BankservAfrica being the trusted partner of the South African financial services industry and integral to the country's national payments system.

BankservAfrica is licensed by the Payments Association of South Africa and regulated by the South African Reserve Bank and the central banks within the African countries where it provides services.

BankservAfrica's SASWITCH brand was a world first in the 1980s:  SASWITCH allows remote ATM access via any institution's clients with any other institution's ATM, regardless of network protocol.

Services 
Services comprise:
 Payment collection
 Payment switching, clearing and settlement
 Payment consulting
 Hosting and operating mission-critical systems
 Business process outsourcing
 SWIFT bureau and payment solutions
 Disaster recovery and business continuity

Dual processing is provided through a production site and a disaster recovery site; to ensure core processing continues uninterrupted should a disaster occur at the production facility.

References

External links 
 
 

Banking in South Africa
Financial services companies established in 1993
Payment clearing systems